Zita Johann (born Elisabeth Johann; 14 July 1904 – 24 September 1993) was an Austrian-American actress. She is known for her role in Karl Freund's film The Mummy (1932) starring Boris Karloff.

Life and career
A German-speaking Banat Swabian, Zita Johann was born Elisabeth Johann in the village of Deutschbentschek (near Timișoara), Austria-Hungary. The village is now part of Romania. Her father, a hussar officer named Stefan Johann, emigrated with his family to the United States in 1911.

She debuted on Broadway in 1924 and made her first film appearance in D.W. Griffith's 1931 film The Struggle. After seven films, she quit to work in theater, collaborating with John Houseman, to whom she was married from 1929 to 1933, and with Orson Welles. She also taught acting to people with learning disorders.

She made her last film appearance in the 1986 horror film Raiders of the Living Dead.

Johann married three times. In 1962, she was a guest artist at Elmwood Playhouse in Nyack, New York, where she directed Don Juan In Hell.

She died in 1993 at age 89 in Nyack, NY. She was cremated and her ashes were scattered on a family farm in upstate New York.

Theatre credits

Filmography

References

External links

Zita Johann papers, 1924-1954, held by the Billy Rose Theatre Division, New York Public Library for the Performing Arts
Zita Johann Photo Gallery at ScienceMonster.Net
Zita Johann biography
Zita Johann on the Deutschbenschek website
Zita Johann photo site

1904 births
1993 deaths
People from Timiș County
Banat Swabians
American stage actresses
Austro-Hungarian emigrants to the United States
20th-century American actresses
People from Nyack, New York